Abracadabra is the twelfth studio album by American rock band Steve Miller Band. The album was released on June 15, 1982, by Capitol Records.

Abracadabra charted in nine countries, including Germany where the record reached No. 1 for a week. Four singles were released from the album: the title track, "Cool Magic", "Keeps Me Wondering Why", and "Give It Up", with the title song charting the highest.

Billboard said of "Cool Magic" that it's a "catchy midtempo pop tune that takes dead aim at car radios everywhere."  Billboard also described it as being "harder rocking" than the title track.  Cash Box called it "a light, straightahead pop/rocker that, in places, brings to mind the Beach Boys or the Beatles."

Track listing

Personnel
 Steve Miller – vocals, guitar, Synclavier, synthesizers on track 2, Roland Jupiter-8 on track 2 and Roland Juno-60 on track 2
 John Massaro – guitar
 Kenny Lee Lewis – guitar; bass guitar on track 2
 Byron Allred – keyboards
 Gerald Johnson – bass guitar
 Gary Mallaber – drums, percussion, keyboards

Additional personnel
 Greg Douglass – guitar on tracks 3 and 8
 Lonnie Turner – bass guitar on tracks 3 and 8

Technical
 Produced by Steve Miller and Gary Mallaber
 Recorded and mixed by David N. Cole
 Additional recording by Gary Mallaber
 Executive Producer – John Palladino
 Photography – David Alexander
 Art – Tommy Steele
 Design – Tommy Steele, Jeff Lancaster

Charts

Weekly charts

Year-end charts

Certifications

References

1982 albums
Steve Miller Band albums
Capitol Records albums
Albums produced by Gary Mallaber